Hanga is a Gur language of Ghana. The people of Hanga are found in the Savannah Region of Ghana

Example Text

References

Bibliography

Oti–Volta languages
Languages of Ghana